Air Guitar World Championships (AGWC) is an annual event taking place in Oulu, Finland. AGWC was arranged for the first time in 1996. Today, national championships are held all around the world.

Playing air guitar is based on mimicking guitar playing. Music genres may vary, but the most common ones are heavy metal and rock.

The idea of having Air Guitar World Championships was generated by musician Jukka Takalo. The first competition was arranged in 1996 as part of Oulu Music Video Festival. Over the years, the contest has grown into its own event. Since 2011 it has been produced by Airnest Productions Ltd., which also takes care of the brand.

In the Air Guitar World Championships, participants from all over the world compete who can play the air guitar the best. The judges represent professionals of performing arts and culture, the guitarist Juha Torvinen among others. The winner gets a custom-made guitar, ‘Flying Finn’, by Matti and Saara Nevalainen. One year, Brian May, the lead guitarist of Queen, donated a VOX BM Special amplifier for the winner.

The Licensed national championships are held annually around the world in over 10 countries. In 2021, the countries in the official AGWC network are USA, Iceland, UK, Japan, Canada, France, Germany, Thailand, Australia, Belgium, Poland, Chile and Taiwan.

The AGWC motto is "Make Air Not War". The purpose of the contest is to promote world peace. According to the competition ideology, wars will end, climate change will stop, and all bad things will vanish when all the people in the world play the air guitar. If you are holding an air guitar, you can't be holding a gun.

Winners

References

External links 

 

Annual events
1996 establishments in Finland
World championships